Omicroides is a monotypic Indomalayan genus of potter wasps. The sole species is Omicroides singularis.

References

Monotypic Hymenoptera genera
Potter wasps